Méras is a commune in the Ariège department, France.

Meras may also refer to:

Icchokas Meras, Lithuanian Jewish writer
María Quinteras de Meras, soldadera (woman soldier) in the rank of colonel in the army of Pancho Villa during the Mexican Revolution
Norma Meras Swenson
Umut Meraş, Turkish footballer
Mera people
Meras River, Sweden

See also

Mera (disambiguation)